Charles Frederick Millspaugh (June 20, 1854– September 15, 1923) was an American botanist and physician, born at Ithaca, N.Y., and educated at Cornell and the New York Homeopathic Medical College. He received his medical degree in 1881 and practiced medicine in Binghamton, New York until 1890. From 1891 to 1892, he taught botany at West Virginia University. In 1894 he was appointed as the newly established Field Museum of Natural History's first Curator of Botany, a position he held until his death. From 1897 to 1923 he was also professor of medical botany at the Chicago Homeopathic Medical College and lectured on botany at the University of Chicago. Millspaugh conducted explorations in the United States and Mexico, the West Indies, Brazil, and other parts of South America, and was the author of American Medical Plants (1887); Flora of West Virginia (1896); Contribution I-III to the Coastal and Plain Flora of Yucatan (1895-1898); "Flora of Santa Carolina Island" (1923); and many articles in scientific and popular journals. He was a skilled scientific illustrator and artist, producing the majority of the illustrations for his publications."

The genera Millspaughia B.L.Rob. and Neomillspaughia S.F.Blake (Polygonaceae) were named in his honor.

Bibliography

Books by and about Charles Frederick Millspaugh on WorldCat

See also

 Nashia
 Cubanthus
 List of botanists by author abbreviation

Notes

External links
"American Medicinal Plants" by C.F. Millspaugh, 1887
Publications by Charles Frederick Millspaugh at the Biodiversity Heritage Library
Flora of West Virginia by C. F. Millspaugh, 1892, Hathi Trust Digital Library
"Contributions to the Flora of the Yucatan" by C.F. Millspaugh
 

American science writers
Botanists active in the Caribbean
American botanists
American male journalists
1854 births
1923 deaths
Cornell University alumni
People associated with the Field Museum of Natural History